is a passenger railway station in the town of Yorii, Saitama, Japan, operated by East Japan Railway Company (JR East).

Lines

Station layout
The station consists of one side platform serving a single track. The station is unattended.

History
The station opened on 6 October 1934.

Passenger statistics
In fiscal 2010, the station was used by an average of 40 passengers daily (boarding passengers only).

Surrounding area
Orihara Elementary School
Jonan Junior High School
Tokyo Lion Yorii plant

See also

 List of railway stations in Japan

References

External links

 JR East station information 

Stations of East Japan Railway Company
Railway stations in Saitama Prefecture
Hachikō Line
Railway stations in Japan opened in 1934
Yorii, Saitama